XHBAJA-FM is a noncommercial radio station on 98.3 FM in San Quintín, Baja California. It is owned by Fundación San Quintín, A.C., which is in turn part of Grupo Uvizra.

XHBAJA received its concession in May 2015 and was among the first radio stations to receive a social concession under Mexican broadcasting reform. It signed on August 12, 2017.

References

Radio stations in Baja California
Radio stations established in 2015